Michael Deacon (born 1980) is a British author and political satirical journalist, who was previously the parliamentary sketch writer for The Daily Telegraph.

After graduating from Sheffield University, Deacon worked for the lads' magazine Zoo Weekly before joining the Daily Telegraph as a culture writer. He later replaced Andrew Gimson in 2011 as the newspaper's parliamentary sketchwriter, which prompted an unsuccessful legal case by Gimson who alleged he was the victim of age discrimination. Deacon has since been replaced as the newspaper's sketchwriter by Madeline Grant.

Deacon was previously the Daily Telegraph's television critic and was shortlisted for the 2014 British Press Awards "Broadcast Columnist of the Year" and "Critic of the Year", losing out to Mark Steel and David Sexton respectively.
He has also appeared on the BBC Radio 4 show The News Quiz. 

Deacon lives with his wife and family in Gravesend, Kent.

References

External links

1980 births
Living people
People from Gravesend, Kent
Alumni of the University of Sheffield
English political journalists
British male journalists
The Daily Telegraph people